Sheykh Hasan (also Romanized as Sheykh Ḩasan; also known as Bīvehnīj and Shaikhan) is a village in Bivanij Rural District, in the Central District of Dalahu County, Kermanshah Province, Iran. At the 2006 census, its population was 83, in 18 families.

References 

Populated places in Dalahu County